A sampan is a relatively flat-bottomed Chinese and Malay wooden boat.  Some sampans include a small shelter on board and may be used as a permanent habitation on inland waters. The design closely resembles Western hard chine boats like the scow or punt. Sampans are generally used for transportation in coastal areas or rivers and are often used as traditional fishing boats. It is unusual for a sampan to sail far from land, as they do not have the means to survive rough weather.

Some think that "sampan" is the Cantonese pronunciation of the Chinese word 舢舨, or "shan-ban" in "Pinyin" (standard) pronunciation). Of the two characters, "舢" (shan, literally "mountain-like") means ocean-going large ship, and "舨" (ban, literally "return") means small boat for shuttling between the ship and shore. Since the small boat is necessary for the big ship where deep water port was not available, it became one word meaning "the small boat for the big ship". Later it was generalized for small flat-bed boats.

Others think that the word "sampan" is derived from the original Cantonese term sāam báan, literally "three planks", but this is likely to be a folk etymology. 

Sampans may be propelled by poles, oars (particularly a single, long sculling oar called a yuloh (simplified Chinese 摇橹/ traditional Chinese 搖櫓) ) or may be fitted with outboard motors.

Sampans are still in use by rural residents of Southeast Asia, particularly in Malaysia, Indonesia, Bangladesh, Myanmar, Sri Lanka and Vietnam.

Malay communities in Southeast Asia, also use the term sampan for their boats. Large boats such as sampan panjang, kolek and perahu panjang are used and built by the Malays and Orang Laut living in their coastal villages.

Image gallery

See also
Casco (barge), Filipino version of Sampan
Sampan panjang, Malay boat

References

External links 

 "Cranks with Planks presents Sampans -n- Yulohs" (via Wayback Machine) (includes excerpt from G.R.G. Worcester's Junks and Sampans of the Yangtse.)

Cantonese culture
Indigenous boats
Types of fishing vessels
Chinese words and phrases
Ships of China